Rouleau is a surname of French origin.

List
 Adolphe Rouleau (1867–1937), French fencer
 Alexandre Rouleau (born 1983), ice hockey player
 Alfred Rouleau CC GOQ (1915–1985), Canadian businessman
 Chantal Rouleau, Canadian politician
 Charles Rouleau (1840–1901), Canadian politician, lawyer, judge
 Chris Rouleau (born 1976), aka Blaze Ya Dead Homie, U.S. rapper
 Denis Rouleau CMM MSM CD, Vice Admiral of the Royal Canadian Navy.
 Duncan Rouleau, U.S. comic book author.
 Eric Rouleau (1926–2015), French journalist and diplomat
 Ernest Rouleau (1916–1991), Canadian botanist; his botanical abbreviation is Rouleau 
 Felix-Raymond-Marie Rouleau OP (1866-1931), Canadian Roman Catholic cardinal
 François Fortunat Rouleau (1849-1907), Canadian politician
 Guy Rouleau (politician) (1923–2010), Canadian politician
 Guy Rouleau (ice hockey) (1965–2008), Canadian hockey player
 Joseph Rouleau CC GOQ (1929–2019), French-Canadian bass opera singer.
 Martin Couture-Rouleau (died 2014) aka Ahmad LeConverti, radicalized Canadian Islamist convert.
 Michel Rouleau (born 1944), Canadian ice hockey player
 Paul Rouleau, Canadian judge
 Raymond Rouleau (1904–1981), Belgian actor-director

References

Surnames of French origin